Prey is a 2022 American science fiction action film in the Predator franchise. It is the fifth installment and is a prequel to the first four films, being set in the Northern Great Plains in 1719. The film is directed by Dan Trachtenberg and written by Patrick Aison. It stars Amber Midthunder, Dakota Beavers, Dane DiLiegro, Michelle Thrush, Stormee Kipp, Julian Black Antelope, and Bennett Taylor. The story revolves around Naru, a skilled Comanche warrior, who is striving to prove herself as a hunter. She finds herself having to protect her people from a vicious, humanoid alien that hunts humans for sport, as well as from French fur traders who are destroying the buffalo they rely on for survival.

Development of the film began during the production of The Predator (2018), when producer John Davis was approached by Trachtenberg and Aison, with a concept that they had been developing since 2016. In late 2020, the film's title was revealed to be the codename for the fifth installment in the franchise. Filming took place around Calgary during the summer of 2021, with the entire film shot in English and some sequences shot in Comanche as well. The remaining sequences were dubbed into Comanche by the cast, reprising their roles. The film is the first feature film to have a full Comanche language dub.

Prey premiered at the San Diego Comic-Con on July 21, 2022, and was released by 20th Century Studios as a Hulu original film in the United States and on Disney+ Star internationally on August 5. The film received positive reviews from critics, with praise for its action sequences, Midthunder's performance, cinematography, Trachtenberg's direction, and the Indigenous casting, with many critics calling it the best Predator installment since the first film.

Plot

In 1719 in the Great Plains, Naru, a young Comanche woman trained as a healer, dreams of becoming a great hunter like her brother, Taabe. While tracking deer with her dog, Sarii, she witnesses the lights of an alien Predator's spacecraft, which she interprets as a Thunderbird, taking it as a sign to prove herself. At the village, one of their tribe's hunters has been taken by a mountain lion. Taabe says Naru can come on the search party, but only to help track the cougar and provide medical treatment if they find the hunter alive. They retrieve the wounded hunter and depart, though Taabe stays behind to find and kill the mountain lion. Finding large unusual tracks and a meticulously skinned rattlesnake, Naru circles back with Paake and finds Taabe. Together the three set a trap for the mountain lion but it kills Paake.

Naru faces off with the big cat on the branch of a tree but, after being distracted by the strange sounds and lights of the Predator in the distance, falls and strikes her head. She wakes up in her family home, having been carried back by Taabe. He later returns to the village carrying the dead mountain lion, earning him the title of War Chief. Convinced of a greater threat they've never seen before, Naru departs with Sarii. She comes across a herd of skinned bison left to rot on the plains; baffled by the wasteful slaughter, she says a prayer for their spirits. Eventually, she stumbles into a mud-filled bog pit, which nearly swallows her before she escapes. Naru and Sarii are later attacked by a grizzly bear. As they flee for their lives, the bear is killed by the Predator, giving Naru time to escape before running into a group of Comanche sent to find her. The Predator ambushes and kills the men in combat, while Naru is caught in a foothold trap; the Predator leaves as it no longer sees her as a threat.

French voyageurs, responsible for slaughtering the bison, come to check their trap, find Naru, and cage her. Their interpreter, Raphael Adolini, questions Naru about the Predator, whom the Frenchmen have encountered before. When she refuses to talk, the lead voyageur reveals that he has Taabe captive and tortures him before using both siblings as bait for the Predator. While tied to a tree, Taabe admits to his sister that she had weakened the mountain lion, enabling him to kill it. The Predator kills most of the Frenchmen while Taabe and Naru escape. Naru rescues Sarii from the camp and stumbles across a dying Raphael, who teaches her how to use his flintlock pistol in exchange for medical treatment for his severed leg. Naru gives him herbs that reduce his body heat to stanch the bleeding. When the Predator arrives, Raphael plays dead, and Naru realizes that, due to his reduced heat, the creature cannot see him. After it accidentally steps on Raphael, he screams, and the Predator kills him.

Taabe arrives on horseback to rescue Naru. Together they weaken the Predator, but it kills Taabe. Naru flees and finds the surviving lead Frenchman. She knocks him out, severs one of his legs, and gives him an unloaded gun before eating the herbs to hide her body heat, baiting the Predator to kill the voyageur. She uses Raphael's pistol to ambush the creature, knocking off its mask, which she has previously seen to hold the targeting system for the Predator's spear gun. She steals the device and flees into the woods. Naru uses the Frenchman's severed leg to lure the Predator into the area with the mud-filled bog pit, where she has positioned the creature's mask so that it targets the pit. Without the mask, the Predator is less effective, so Naru injures it significantly before dragging it into the bog. As the Predator rises from the pit, it fires the spear gun at Naru and misses; the projectile homes in on the Predator, killing it. Naru severs its head and paints her face with its glowing green blood. She brings the head and the flintlock pistol back to her tribe. They honor her victory by declaring Naru as the new War Chief. Naru informs her tribe that it is time for them to move out.

During the end credits in what amounts to a post-credit sequence, depicted as Comanche art, it's shown the tribe was attacked by another alien ship. Taking into account the history of the flintlock and the end of Predator 2, It seems that the tribe was tragically wiped out by the Predators.

Cast

 Dakota Beavers as Taabe, Naru's brother and a skilled hunter. In August 2022, Bennett Taylor confirmed that the script for Prey revealed Billy Sole, a Native American tracker and scout played by Sonny Landham in the original Predator (1987), to be a reincarnation of Taabe, reframing his "last stand" with that film's Predator as being due to subconscious memories of a past life.
 Dane DiLiegro as the Predator, shown to wield primitive versions of the advanced weaponry used by Predators in previous future-set films. 
 Michelle Thrush as Aruka, Naru and Taabe's mother
 Julian Black Antelope as Chief Kehetu
 Coco as Sarii, Naru's dog companion
 Stormee Kipp as Wasape, a Comanche hunter who looks down on Naru
 Mike Paterson as Big Beard
 Bennett Taylor as Raphael Adolini, an Italian translator hired by the French. This character was first alluded to in Predator 2 (1990) and later depicted in the comic book Predator: 1718 (1996).
 Nelson Leis as Waxed Mustache
 Troy Mundle as Spyglass

Production

Development and casting

The film began development during the production of the prior Predator film, titled The Predator (2018), when producer John Davis was approached by Dan Trachtenberg and screenwriter Patrick Aison, with a concept they had been working on since 2016. 20th Century Studios production president Emma Watts fast-tracked the development of the film, which was expected to be R-rated.

In December 2019, the film was initially under wraps, going by the name of Skulls. The film reportedly was to "follow a Comanche woman who goes against gender norms and traditions to become a warrior". It was to be directed by Trachtenberg and written by Aison. Cast auditions were held in February 2020, before pre-production was shut down by the COVID-19 pandemic. In November 2020, Skulls was revealed to be a codename for a fifth installment in the Predator franchise, with the same creative team working on the film. It was not expected to correlate to the events of the prior installment. Upon the announcement, Trachtenberg indicated that the original intention was to market the film with no reference to the Predators, something no longer possible with the confirmation of the film's place in the franchise.

In May 2021, Amber Midthunder was announced to star. On November 12, 2021, Disney+ Day, the film was given the title Prey, and announced for a mid-2022 release on Hulu and Disney+ internationally. Trachtenberg explained his goal for the film was to get back to the roots of the franchise: "the ingenuity of a human being who won't give up, who's able to observe and interpret, basically being able to beat a stronger, more powerful, well-armed force". Dane DiLiegro ended up becoming the Predator because Dan Trachtenberg sought a different type compared to the original portrayer Kevin Peter Hall's "WWF 1987 wrestler standoff type thing", leading to someone with a more 'feline' athletic body,  that would also allow what effects artist Alec Gillis described as "some elegance and fluidity of movement as opposed to the Hulking Stuntman School of Suit Performance."

Filming

Filming occurred in Calgary, Alberta, Canada, in 2021, primarily in Stoney Nakoda First Nation land 45 minutes outside the city, with studio set pieces including the beaver dam where Naru hides from a bear and the fur trapper camp where she baits the Predator. The cast preceded filming with four weeks of training camp, working with weapons and personal trainers, and while team-building they conceived a sign language for the characters to communicate non-verbally. Midthunder had a particular focus on axe throwing, which led to her and Trachtenberg adding a rope for quick recovery. Jhane Myers, a member of both the Comanche Nation and the Blackfeet Nation, served as a producer on the film. Describing filming near Calgary, Myers stated, "We were shooting on Stoney Nakoda land. [Midthunder] is part Nakoda, even I am on my grandmother's side. Usually when we start a production, someone [from the Native community] comes in and does a cedar ceremony and blesses everything. But because we had so many Indigenous people on the cast, First Nation people too, and since we were on true plains land, they sent out two pipe carriers and two smudge people to have a pipe ceremony." The pipe ceremony was conducted outside Calgary by local Indigenous leaders and attended by Midthunder and her co-stars Beavers and Kipp, as well as Myers and Trachtenberg, among others. The first scenes filmed involved the Comanche camp, including the ending right in the second week, before moving onto parts focusing on Naru solo and the French trappers prior to actually featuring the Predator on the set.

Cinematographer Jeff Cutter filmed in the anamorphic format to better depict the vast locations, using a relatively naturalistic approach without much artificial lighting, "to respect nature and to respect the landscapes", which in the night sequences relied mostly on torches along with "soft, low underexposed amounts of blue" to replicate moonlight. For added illumination in the actors' faces, the torches would also have LED strips on the end that faced away from the camera. The day scenes took advantage from how daylight lasts "close to 14 or 15 hours a day" in Calgary during the summer, along with how the magic hour lasted twice as long as in Los Angeles. Cutter considered the most difficult scene to film was the sequence where the Predator fights the French trapper expedition, which was shot across eight days in a  area with a hundred scenographic trees and three smoke machines. The scenes depicting the Predator vision were filmed with a thermographic camera lying on top of the regular one.

In July 2021, Davis revealed that the film was officially three quarters of the way finished. In September, filming wrapped and the castings of Dakota Beavers and Dane DiLiegro were confirmed. Sarii, Naru's dog companion, was played by a Carolina dog named Coco who was adopted and trained specifically for the film. The idea of giving Naru a dog companion was inspired by Mad Max 2. Initially, Coco was to be in fewer scenes, but they found with her training and energy they were able to include the dog in several more scenes, including some of the action sequences.

Language
Trachtenberg said they discussed whether they should start the film with characters speaking the Comanche language before switching to English for the benefit of the audience, similar to the Russian language in The Hunt for Red October (1990). They considered a similar approach at first but ultimately felt it did not work. The film was shot in English and later dubbed in Comanche, with the entire cast performing an alternate all-Comanche dub of the film. The film is the first feature film to have a full Comanche language dub. Both language versions, Comanche and English, are available on Hulu and Disney+.

Special effects
Amalgamated Dynamics Inc. (ADI) was hired to work on the special and creature effects on the film, having previously worked on The Predator and the crossover films Alien vs. Predator (2004) and Aliens vs. Predator: Requiem (2007). The Predator's new design aimed to make him scarier and also take advantage of the leaner physique of portrayer Dane DiLiegro. To make him less humanoid, there were changes to the face like more spaced eyes that led to a head fully made of animatronics standing atop DiLiegro's own, reducing his sight to two small holes in the neck piece. The costume, which had the challenge of being flexible for the fight choreography while resistant enough to withstand the location's weather, weighted  and was primarily made out of foam latex, which DiLiegro noted as being "essentially a sponge" getting heavier and wetter as he sweated under the summer sun.

During post-production, Moving Picture Company was the primary contractor for the visual effects; these included a full digital recreation of the Predator, mostly for scenes where he is invisible or to augment or replace parts of the animatronic suit, along with computer-generated animals, blood, arrows and environmental enhancements. DiLiegro himself provided the digital Predator's motion capture. Additional visual effects were provided by Industrial Light & Magic, Track VFX and Pixel Light Effects. The Third Floor, Inc. provided previsualization reels. The film's main and end titles were done by Filmograph in collaboration with Native American illustrators, who provided an animated version of a Plains-style hide painting, which depicts the film's entire narrative. At the very end, the painting includes action not shown in the film: Naru, Saari and three other Comanche are gathered around the severed head of the Predator. They look up and, amid lightning, see three Predator spaceships headed down from the sky towards them. The dailies and color were provided by Company 3. Sound design was done by Pacific Standard Sound.

Music

Sarah Schachner composed the musical score. Trachtenberg hired her after playing Assassin's Creed: Valhalla during pre-production and being impressed with her score for the game. Schachner said the music had to play a big role given the film's sparse dialogue, with the challenge of "feeling equally large and expansive as well as intimate and raw", as it featured both "fun gory action and suspense" and Naru's emotional character arc. Trachtenberg worked closely with Schachner to develop Naru’s theme, as the director "was adamant that it should feel like a journey; that it starts small and really take you somewhere.” Schachner recorded most of the strings herself, and Native American musician Robert Mirabal provided flute and vocals. The soundtrack album was released by Hollywood Records on August 5, 2022.

Historical accuracy
During the film's production, Myers provided binders of reference materials to the production team. Myers advised the production on creating a period-accurate toothbrush, which Midthunder can be seen using in the film. An early draft of the script did not include mention of horses; Myers insisted that horses be added, later stating, "We're a horse culture, so you can see that in [the character of] Taabe and his horse riding. And then you can see that in the camps where we have horses. When I originally saw the first script, there were no horses in it. And I said, 'You can't have Comanches without horses!' So that's where that came in, and when we wrote the Taabe scene." People in the southwest began to acquire horses in the 16th century by trading or stealing them from Spanish colonists in New Mexico. As horse culture moved northward, the Comanche were among the first to commit to a fully mounted nomadic lifestyle. This occurred by the 1730s, when they had acquired enough horses to put all their people on horseback.

Brad Curran of Screen Rant described the Comanche characters' clothing, village setting, and hunting lifestyle depicted in the film as historically accurate, along with the depiction of the French trappers as hostile towards the Comanche. Curran added that the film makes traditional Comanche gender roles "central to its story", writing that, in Comanche culture, men took on more physical roles as hunters and warriors, while women served as caregivers who oversaw homes, children, and food preparation.

Release

Streaming
Prey premiered at the San Diego Comic-Con on July 21, 2022, and was released by 20th Century Studios as a Hulu original film on August 5. It was also released on Disney+ Hotstar in Southeast Asian territories, on Star+ in Latin America and on Disney+ as part of the Star content hub in other international territories.

Reception

Audience viewership 
According to 20th Century Studios, Prey was the most-watched premiere across all films and television series on Hulu in the United States, as well as the most-watched film premiere on Star in international markets, and on Star+ in Latin America. According to streaming aggregator Reelgood, Prey was the most watched program across all platforms during the week of August 12, 2022. According to Whip Media, Prey was the most watched movie in the United States, during the week of August 5, 2022 to August 7, 2022.

Critical response 
 Metacritic gave the film a weighted average score of 71 out of 100, based on 43 critics, indicating "generally favorable reviews". It became the highest-rated Predator film on both websites.

David Fear of Rolling Stone referred to the film as a "long-awaited masterpiece" and "series highlight", and compared Midthunder's character favorably to Ellen Ripley of the Alien films. Andrew Webster of The Verge admired "how patient it is", adding: "what makes Prey work is its simplicity. It never strays from its concept, instead slowly building up the tension before reaching a very exciting battle." Belen Edwards of Mashable called it "intimate and character-driven, with more than enough action to satisfy the most die-hard Predator fans ... even if you've never watched a Predator movie, chances are you'll love Prey. It's just that good."

In a 3.5 out of 4 star review, Odie Henderson of RogerEbert.com praised Naru's character and the representation of the Comanche Nation, and called the film a "scary and fun amusement park ride that also elicits a surprisingly tender emotional response". Tom Jorgensen of IGN rated it 8 out of 10, commended the level of violence and tension depicted across the action sequences, and felt the story was simple without being simplistic. James Dyer of Empire rated the movie 4 out of 5 stars and found it to be the best Predator since the original, with a "ferocious heroine, authentic period setting, and a bloody string of inventive action beats".

Wendy Ide, in a 4 star review in The Observer, said that Prey "stays true to the essence of the original – stylishly violent, stickily graphic, impossibly tense" but that it was also successful "as a self-contained entity". Clarisse Loughrey gave the film 4 stars in a review in The Independent praising the lighting and sound design while also hailing the film's message of empowerment. Benjamin Lee for The Guardian gave the film 3 stars but said that "it feels genuinely new to see a genre film of this scale centred on an almost entirely Native cast". Kevin Maher in The Times enjoyed the jeopardy of the film with characters being "in actual danger of harm, injury or even death".

Two stars from the original Predator film commented positively. Jesse Ventura praised Amber Midthunder and the director: "Thank you for making a such a thoughtful, creative, and wonderful film." Bill Duke was also enthusiastic about the film: "It's an amazing film and @AmberMidthunder is phenomenal".

Accolades

Future
Prior to the film's release, Trachtenberg stated in June that there are discussions for additional installments to be developed after the release of Prey, saying their intent was to "do things that have not been done before" in the franchise. In August, Bennett Taylor expressed interest in reprising his role as Raphael Adolini as "the pirate he is" in a potential prequel to Prey, serving as a loose adaptation of the 1996 comic book Predator: 1718 in which Adolini was introduced, reading it as research before shooting Prey, having aimed to "bring as much of [Raphael] into Prey that made sense".

Notes

References

External links
 Official website
 

2020s monster movies
2020s war films
2020s Western (genre) horror films 
2022 action adventure films
2022 action thriller films
2022 horror thriller films
2022 science fiction action films
2022 science fiction horror films
20th Century Studios films
American historical horror films
American monster movies
American science fiction action films
American science fiction horror films
American Western (genre) horror films
American Western (genre) science fiction films
Davis Entertainment films
Films set in 1719
Films about extraterrestrial life
Films about hunter-gatherers
Films about Native Americans
Native American action films
Native American horror films
Comanche-language films
Comanche tribe
Films directed by Dan Trachtenberg
Films set in Colorado
Films shot in Calgary
Films impacted by the COVID-19 pandemic
Hulu original films
Predator (franchise) films
Prequel films
2020s American films
American prequel films
Films about cougars